Central Telegraph Office may refer to:

Central Telegraph Office, Colombo, Sri Lanka
Central Telegraph Office, Yangon, Myanmar